Scopula brachypus is a moth of the family Geometridae. It was described by Prout in 1926. It is endemic to Burma.

References

Endemic fauna of Myanmar
Moths described in 1926
brachypus
Taxa named by Louis Beethoven Prout
Moths of Asia